Hoefnagel is a surname. Notable people with the surname include:

 Hanneke Hoefnagel (born 1988), Dutch gymnast
 Jacob Hoefnagel (1573– 1632), Flemish artist, diplomat, merchant, and politician
 Joris Hoefnagel (1542–1601), Flemish artist and merchant

See also
 Hufnagel